Ghislain Akassou (born 15 February 1975) is an Ivorian former professional footballer who played as a defender. He was a member of the Ivory Coast squad for the 1998, 2000 and 2002 Africa Cup of Nations.

External links

1975 births
Living people
Association football defenders
Ivorian footballers
Ivory Coast international footballers
1998 African Cup of Nations players
2000 African Cup of Nations players
2002 African Cup of Nations players
Ivorian expatriate footballers
ASEC Mimosas players
FC Lugano players
K.S.K. Beveren players
U.S. Pistoiese 1921 players
A.C.N. Siena 1904 players
A.C. Prato players
A.S. Sambenedettese players
Serie B players